Attila Végh is a Hungarian sprint canoer who competed in the late 1990s.

He won a silver medal in the C-2 200 m event in 1997 and again at the 1998 ICF Canoe Sprint World Championships in Szeged, a team gold in 2002, and a solo bronze in 2008 in Milan:
 Team 1997 Athletics C-2 - Sprint Championship canoe 200 m silver 36 328
 Team 1998 Athletics C-2 - Sprint World Championships 200m canoe silver 38 473
 Team 2002 Athletics C-2 - Sprint Championship in Szeged canoe 200 m gold 36 899
 2008 Canoe Sprint C-2 - Sprint Championship Milan canoe 200 m bronze 38 577

References

Hungarian male canoeists
Living people
Year of birth missing (living people)
ICF Canoe Sprint World Championships medalists in Canadian
20th-century Hungarian people